Klassart  is an Icelandic blues band which was formed in Sandgerði on 19 November 2006. The band's lyrics are mostly in English, except for the song "Örlagablús", even though all members are native Icelanders.

Klassart was started by Smári Guðmundsson, older brother of the lead singer, Fríða Dís Guðmundsdóttir. Their older brother Palmar Guðmundsson joined the band in 2009.

In 2006, the band won the Rás 2 blues competition. The John Prine cover "Gamli grafreiturinn" from their 2010 album, Bréf frá París, reached the top of the Icelandic charts.

The band has played at many places in different parts of Iceland. They played at the Icelandic Blues Festival in Reykjavík on 20 March 2008 and at the Iceland Airwaves in October 2010.

Discography

Albums
2007: Bottle of Blues
2010: Bréf frá París
2014: Smástirni

Singles
2007: "Bottle of blues"
2007: "Painkillers & Beer"
2007: "Örlagablús"
2010: "Bréf frá París"
2010: "Þangað til það tekst"
2010: "Gamli grafreiturinn"
2013: "Smástirni"
2014: "Flugmiði aðra leið"
2014: "Landamæri"

References

External links 
 Klassart's official MySpace page
 Klassart's official Facebook page

Icelandic musical groups